Jeonathan Prato (16 February 1913 – 5 January 2006; Hebrew: יהונתן פראטו) was a lawyer, a yishuv envoy, and an Israeli diplomat.

Early life 
Jeonathan Prato was born on 16 February 1913 in Florence, Italy, where his father, David Prato, was the Chief Cantor. The father went on to become Rabbi of Alexandria (1927–1936). Meanwhile, Jeonathan Prato obtained a Ph.D. in Law and made aliyah in 1936. [Prof. Rabbi David Prato became Chief Rabbi of Rome (1936–1938 and again 1945–1951) and lived in Tel Aviv in between.]

Career 
In Mandatory Palestine, Dr. Prato worked initially as a teacher of Italian and head of the Italian section of the British governmental Jerusalem Calling radio station. In 1940, Dr. Jeonathan Prato and his father negotiated as emissaries for the yishuv with the Italian and Vatican authorities a plan to rescue Jews from Poland through Italy. In 1941, Jeonathan Prato was named a lawyer.

Israeli foreign service 
On 1 May 1949, Dr. Jeonathan Prato joined the foreign service of the young State of Israel. Initially he worked at the Israeli embassy in Italy, then in Argentina after an interlude in Israel. In 1959, Israel's foreign minister Golda Meir appointed Prato diplomatic envoy in Athens. Next, Jeonathan Prato served as the Minister to Cuba (1960-1963).

As an advisor for church relations, Prato welcomed Pope Paul VI in 1964 to Israel at the Ta'anakh Crossing. From 1969 to 1972, Prato served as Ambassador in Costa Rica and Nicaragua. During the last year, this position also included Honduras. Prato managed the Church Relations Division from 1973 until his retirement from the foreign service on 28 February 1978. In his retirement, he worked another 5 years as an archivist.

Personal and legacy 
In 1951, Dr. Jeonathan Prato donated historical chairs to the Bezalel National Museum (that later merged into the Israel Museum), in memory of his father. The same year, Prato received into his possession a famous Haggadah that was created around the year 1300. This Haggadah had been the personal property of the famous Rome-based art-dealer, scholar and collector Ludwig Pollak. Pollak and his family are thought  to have been murdered in the course of the deportation of the Jews of Rome to Auschwitz on October 23, 1943 or upon arrival at Auschwitz. This book had initially been promised to the father of Prato. Prato sold it in 1964 to the Jewish Theological Seminary of America. It is still known as the Prato Haggadah.

Prato was married and had one child. He died on 5 January 2006, aged 92, in Jerusalem. Prato was buried on Har HaMenuchot.

References

Italian emigrants to Mandatory Palestine
20th-century Italian Jews
20th-century Israeli lawyers
Ambassadors of Israel to Costa Rica
Ambassadors of Israel to Honduras
Ambassadors of Israel to Nicaragua
Ambassadors of Israel to Cuba
1913 births
2006 deaths
Diplomats from Jerusalem
Israeli diplomats
Diplomats from Florence
Mandatory Palestine lawyers
Italian radio journalists
Yishuv journalists
Lawyers from Jerusalem
Mass media people from Jerusalem
Teachers of Italian
Israeli radio journalists